The Feminist Initiative (IF) was a minor centre-left Polish political party advocating for women's rights. It was registered on 11 January 2007 and was known as Women's Party until the 27th of August 2016. It was dissolved on 19 January 2020.

This party worked to strengthen and defend women's rights, abortion rights, LGBT rights, asylum rights and refugee rights.

In the 21 October 2007 National Assembly election, the party won 0.28% of the popular vote and no seats in the Sejm or the Senate of Poland. In 2011 general election, the party unsuccessfully stood candidates for election to the Sejm from the Democratic Left Alliance lists. In 2016 "Women's Party" was renamed "Feminist Initiative".

After 13 years of existence, in early 2020 the party was dissolved.

External links
 Inicjatywa Feministyczna
 Danuta Filipowicz, Feminist parties: "Everything for the future - and nothing to hide", The Krakow Post, Friday, 5 October 2007

References

2007 establishments in Poland
2021 disestablishments in Poland
Defunct social democratic parties in Poland
Feminism in Poland
Feminist parties in Europe
Political parties disestablished in 2020
Political parties established in 2007
Progressive parties